A snout is the protruding portion of an animal's face.

Snout may also refer to:
 The snout reflex, in neurology, an abnormal pursing of the lips indicative of brain damage
 Snout house, a house that is constructed with an attached front entry garage that is closer to the street than any other part of the house
 Weasel's snout, a herbaceous annual plant of the family Plantaginaceae
 Cauldron Snout, a waterfall on the River Tees in Northern England
 Tom Snout, a fictional character in William Shakespeare's A Midsummer Night's Dream
 Snout Spout, a character in the media franchise Masters of the Universe
 Snout (band), an Australian band active in the 1990s and early 2000s
 The terminus of a glacier

Animals:
 Broad-snouted caiman
 Long-snouted pipefish
 Long-snouted spinner dolphin
 Rough snouted giant gecko
 Sharp snouted piranha
 Short-snouted New Caledonian gecko
 Slender-snouted crocodile
 Snout beetle
 Snout butterfly
 Snout moth
 Snouted night adder

Snout may be slang for:
 A nose
 An informer
 A member of the Protestant community of Northern Ireland
 Tobacco, in British prison slang